Arpa Darreh (also Romanized as Ārpā Darreh and Ārpādarah; also known as Ārpeh Darreh) is a village in Sardrud-e Olya Rural District, Sardrud District, Razan County, Hamadan Province, Iran. At the 2006 census, its population was 955, in 229 families.

References 

Populated places in Razan County